Christopher John Ellis (born September 22, 1992) is an American professional baseball pitcher who is currently a free agent. He has previously played in MLB for the Kansas City Royals, Tampa Bay Rays and Baltimore Orioles.

Career

Amateur
Ellis was drafted by the Los Angeles Dodgers in the 50th round of the 2011 Major League Baseball Draft out of Spain Park High School in Hoover, Alabama. He did not sign with the Dodgers and attended the University of Mississippi (Ole Miss) to play college baseball. In 2013, he played collegiate summer baseball with the Cotuit Kettleers of the Cape Cod Baseball League.

Los Angeles Angels
Ellis was selected by the Los Angeles Angels of Anaheim in the third round of the 2014 MLB Draft. He signed and made his professional debut with the rookie-level Orem Owlz where he pitched to a 6.89 earned run average (ERA) in  innings pitched. Ellis started 2015 with the High-A Inland Empire 66ers, and after going 4–5 with a 3.88 ERA in 11 games, was promoted to the Double-A Arkansas Travelers, where he finished the season, posting a 7–4 win–loss record and 3.92 ERA in 15 games.

Atlanta Braves
On November 12, 2015, the Angels traded Ellis, Sean Newcomb, Erick Aybar and cash to the Atlanta Braves in exchange for Andrelton Simmons and José Briceño. Ellis was assigned to the Double-A Mississippi Braves to start the 2016 season, and promoted to the Triple-A Gwinnett Braves in June. Ellis ended 2016 with a combined 12–9 record and 4.49 ERA in 28 total games started between both clubs. After the 2016 season, the Braves assigned Ellis to the Salt River Rafters of the Arizona Fall League.

St. Louis Cardinals
On December 1, 2016, the Braves traded Ellis, John Gant, and Luke Dykstra to the St. Louis Cardinals in exchange for Jaime García. Ellis spent 2017 with both the Double-A Springfield Cardinals and Triple- A Memphis Redbirds, posting a combined 7–12 record with a 5.29 ERA in 30 games (22 starts) between both teams. He returned to Springfield to begin the 2018 season and was promoted to Memphis during the season. In 31 games (21 starts) between the two clubs, Ellis compiled a 10–4 record with a 3.93 ERA.

Kansas City Royals
On December 13, 2018, the Texas Rangers selected Ellis in the 2018 Rule 5 draft and traded him to the Kansas City Royals. Ellis made the Royals' Opening Day roster. He made his major league debut on March 31, 2019, versus the Chicago White Sox, recording one scoreless inning of relief. On April 3, 2019, Ellis was designated for assignment.

St. Louis Cardinals (second stint)
On April 9, 2019, the Royals returned Ellis to the Cardinals organization. Ellis did not play in a game in 2020 due to the cancellation of the minor league season because of the COVID-19 pandemic. On May 27, 2020, he was released by St. Louis.

Tampa Bay Rays
On December 16, 2020, Ellis signed a minor league contract with the Tampa Bay Rays organization. On August 16, 2021, Ellis's contract was selected by the Rays. In his Rays debut, Ellis pitched 4 scoreless innings, while striking out 7 batters. The following day, August 18, Ellis was designated for assignment by the Rays.

Baltimore Orioles
On August 20, 2021, Ellis was claimed off of waivers by the Baltimore Orioles. Ellis posted a 2.49 ERA in six starts for Baltimore, striking out 16 in  innings of work. On November 5, Ellis was outrighted off of the 40-man roster and elected free agency.

On March 16, 2022, the Orioles re-signed Ellis on a minor league contract. The Orioles promoted him to the major leagues on April 19. On May 4, Ellis underwent arthroscopic shoulder surgery, ending his 2022 season. 

On November 1, 2022, Ellis elected free agency.

See also
Rule 5 draft results

References

External links

Ole Miss Rebels bio

1992 births
Living people
People from Birmingham, Alabama
Baseball players from Alabama
Major League Baseball pitchers
Kansas City Royals players
Tampa Bay Rays players
Baltimore Orioles players
Ole Miss Rebels baseball players
Cotuit Kettleers players
Orem Owlz players
Inland Empire 66ers of San Bernardino players
Arkansas Travelers players
Mississippi Braves players
Gwinnett Braves players
Springfield Cardinals players
Memphis Redbirds players
Durham Bulls players
Norfolk Tides players
Salt River Rafters players
Leones del Escogido players
American expatriate baseball players in the Dominican Republic
Sultanes de Monterrey players
Gigantes del Cibao players